is a former Japanese football player.

Playing career
Koya was born in Kanagawa Prefecture on May 24, 1970. After graduating from Aoyama Gakuin University, he joined JEF United Ichihara in 1993. He debuted in 1993 and played many matches as right and left side back. However he could not play at all in the match in 1995 and he moved to Japan Football League club Brummell Sendai in 1996. He retired end of 1996 season.

Club statistics

References

External links

1970 births
Living people
Aoyama Gakuin University alumni
Association football people from Kanagawa Prefecture
Japanese footballers
J1 League players
Japan Football League (1992–1998) players
JEF United Chiba players
Vegalta Sendai players
Association football defenders